Seton Hill may refer to:

 Seton Hill, Baltimore, a neighborhood and historic district in central Baltimore, Maryland, USA
 Seton Hill University, a private Catholic university in Greensburg, Pennsylvania, USA

See also
 Seton Hall University, a private Catholic university in South Orange, New Jersey